Grand Gedeh-1 is an electoral district for the elections to the House of Representatives of Liberia. The constituency covers Zwedru city.

Elected representatives

References

Electoral districts in Liberia